The Exorcist's Meter is a 2017 Hong Kong supernatural television drama produced by Television Broadcasts Limited (TVB). It stars Kenneth Ma, Mandy Wong, Hubert Wu, Moon Lau, Hugo Wong, Ram Chiang and Susan Tse. A second season was aired in 2020.

Synopsis
 Ma Kwai (Kenneth Ma) is an optimistic taxi driver. One day, he accidentally wakes the stone spirit  Shek Kam Dong (Hubert Wu). Since then, he is able to see ghosts and spirits. Meanwhile, Ma meets  Bella Bui  (Moon Lau), a supernatural TV host, and together they go on supernatural  adventures. Bella gradually develops feelings for Ma. Nevertheless, Ma has had a crush on his regular passenger,  Dr. Felicity Chong  (Mandy Wong). In the meantime, a demon endangers the world. Shek Kam Dong loses his powers while battling with it. Surprisingly, Ma shows powers which enables him to fight the demon...

Production
A costume fitting press conference was held on 25 August 2016. The filming lasted from August to December 2016.

Cast and Characters

Main Cast
Kenneth Ma as Ma Kwai (馬季), better known as Siu Ma (小馬), a night shift taxi driver. His biological parents had died when he was a child. He was adopted by Leung Ching-ching, the mother of his deceased friend at the age of eight. Although he has encountered countless accidents, he has managed to survive through them all. He has a crush on his regular passenger, Dr. Felicity Chong, but doesn't have the courage to confess due to their differences in occupation and social status. One day, he accidentally wakes the stone spirit, Shek Kam Dong. Since then, he has gained the ability to see ghosts.
Mandy Wong as Dr. Felicity Chong Tsz-yeuk (莊芷若), an elegant and kind-hearted Emergency Room doctor and one of Siu Ma's regular passengers. She is unable to let go of her late fiancé and keeps her feelings to herself, but finds comfort in sharing her troubles with Siu Ma, who gradually develops a trustworthy relationship with her.
Wong also portrays Salvia, a demon who takes the form of Felicity. 
Hubert Wu as Shek Kam Dong (石敢當), a 3000-year-old stone spirit who was accidentally awoken from his 300-year slumber by Siu Ma. He is righteous and takes his job as an exorcist seriously, He later becomes a close friend to Siu Ma and his family. 
Moon Lau as Bella Pui Pui-na (貝貝娜), better known as Bear Bear (啤啤), a reluctant host to a supernatural variety show who wants to be an anchor and another regular passenger of Siu Ma. Although she hosts a supernatural show, she is ironically afraid of ghosts. She comes to understand them as she joins Siu Ma in his exorcism antics. She later develops feelings for Siu Ma.
Hugo Wong as Kwok Chin-ming (郭展明), a police officer with a dark past. When he was a child, he was often abused by his father, but he developed feelings for Felicity,  who stood up for him as kids. Jealous of her relationship with Siu Ma, he forms a contract with Salvia, who grants him powers behind human comprehension. 
Ram Chiang as Mok Yau-wai (莫有為), Leung Ching-ching's brother and an amateur scientist. He deeply cares for her and Siu Ma. 
Susan Tse as Leung Ching-ching (梁晶晶), a superstitious massagist and Siu Ma's foster mother.

Supporting Cast
Willie Wai as Chan Wing-lim (陳永廉), better known as Do Do Sir (嘟嘟Sir), a Senior Superintendent of Police of the District Crime Squad. He originally suspected his wife was cheating on him, but later discovers her job as a cosplayer with Siu Ma’s help, later supporting her. As a result of helping him, he assists Siu Ma with his supernatural antics.
Raymond Chiu as Luk Ka-yat (陸嘉一), better known as Seven (些粉), a night shift taxi driver and Siu Ma's good friend. His nickname is a direct pun to his Chinese name, which literally means "six plus one". 
Lau Kong as Kwok Wing-sing (郭永城), Chin Ming’s father who used to abuse him when he was a child and is paralysed.
King Kong Lee as Ma Ka-lit (馬家烈), better known as Lik Gor (力哥), Siu Ma's birth father. He owned a noodle shop. 
Kitty Yuen as Kwai Li-fu (季莉芙), better known as Lik So (力嫂), Lik Gor's wife and Siu Ma's birth mother. 
Iris Lam as Cheung Pui-ling (張佩玲), She is the sister of Chin-ming‘s deceased partner and has a crush on Kwok Chin-ming.
Kayee Tam as Lily (莉莉), a doll spirit from the doll owned by Bear Bear. 
Anthony Ho as Lung Mou (龍荗), better known as Lung Mao (龍貓), a night shift taxi driver and Siu Ma's friend.

Guest Appearance
Helena Law as Lung Por (龍婆), Siu Ma’s taxi passenger and a psychic. (Episode 1)
Mandy Lam as Ivy Yip Pui-mei (葉佩薇), a producer from the news department. (Episode 7-8 and 15)
Tony Hung as a ghost and Bella Pui’s fan.

Viewership ratings
The following is a table that includes a list of the total ratings points based on television viewership. "Viewers in millions" refers to the number of people, derived from TVB Jade ratings in Hong Kong who watched the episode live and on myTV SUPER.

Awards and nominations

TVB Anniversary Awards 2017

People’s Choice Tevision Awards 2017

2017 Hong Kong Tevision Awards

References

TVB dramas
2017 Hong Kong television series debuts
2017 Hong Kong television series endings